Askio (Greek: Άσκιο) is a former municipality in Kozani regional unit, West Macedonia, Greece. Since the 2011 local government reform it is part of the municipality Voio, of which it is a municipal unit. The municipal unit has an area of 196.636 km2. The 2011 census recorde 4,002 residents in Askio. The seat of the municipality was in Kaloneri. It was named after the Askio mountain range which covers most of the municipal unit.

References

Former municipalities in Western Macedonia
Populated places in Kozani (regional unit)

bg:Синяк (дем)